Scott Keith MacLennan (born 30 November 1987 in Glasgow) is a  Scotland cricketer who played in the 2006 U-19 Cricket World Cup in Sri Lanka. He was educated at Fettes  College, Edinburgh, and St John's College, Cambridge. He later played first-class cricket for Cambridge University.

References

1987 births
Living people
Scottish cricketers
Cambridge University cricketers
People educated at Fettes College
Alumni of St John's College, Cambridge
Cambridge MCCU cricketers